Sir Walter de Olifard (died 1242), Lord of Bothwell and Abernethy and Justiciar of Lothian, was a Scottish noble.

Life
Olifard was the eldest son of Walter de Olifard and Christiana de Strathearn. He was known as the younger to distinguish between his father. Walter held the office of Justiciar of Lothian between 1221 and 1242. He founded a church at Ormiston, near Bothwell dedicated to Saint Catherine.

Marriage and issue
His spouse was known at his death as Isabella. He is known to have had the following known issue:
William de Olifard, married Isabel Douglas, had issue.
Hugh de Olifard
Walter de Olifard

Citations

References

Year of birth unknown
1242 deaths
13th-century Scottish people
Medieval Scottish knights
Oliphant family